Bolay may refer to:

Sylvain Bolay (born 1963), French cyclist
Veronica Bolay (1941–2010), German-Irish artist
Bolay, a synonym for Pu'er tea
Bolay, a single from Uzair Jaswal